The electricity sector in Venezuela is one of the few in the world to rely primarily on hydroelectricity, which accounted for 64% in 2015 (71% in 2004).

Electricity production
In 2015, the total of electricity production reaches 117 TWh, of which 64% comes from hydro, 19% from gas and 17% from oil. Losses however are uncommonly high, reaching 34% of production.

In 2015, Venezuela produced 75 TWh of hydropower, which accounts 1.9% of world's total, a small increase over the production of 2004 of 70 TWh . The installed capacity had however in 2012 reached 26 GW from a total of 13.76 GW at the end of 2002, where 4.5 GW were under construction and 7.4 GW planned. The World Energy Council energy resource report of 2010 estimates the gross theoretical hydropower production could reach 731 TWh per annum, of which 100 TWh are economically exploitable, an increase over the 320 TWh estimates of 2004. 

Hydroelectricity production is concentrated on the Caroní River in Guayana Region. Today it has 4 different dams. The largest hydroplant is the Guri dam with 10,200 MW of installed capacity, which makes it the third-largest hydroelectric plant in the world. Other hydroelectric projects on the Caroní are Caruachi Dam, Macagua I, Macagua II and Macagua III, with a total of 15.910 MW of installed capacity in 2003. A new dams, Tocoma (2 160 MW) and Tayucay (2 450 MW), was under construction between Guri and Caruachi in 2003. With a projected installed capacity for the whole Hydroelectric Complex (upstream Caroni River and downstream Caroni River), between 17.250 and 20.000 MW were planned for 2010.

Organizations
The largest power companies are state-owned CVG  (EDELCA), a subsidiary of the mining company Corporación Venezolana de Guayana (CVG), and Compania Anonima de Administracion y Fomento Electrico accounting respectively for approximately 63% and 18% of generating capacities. In 2007, PDVSA bought 82.14% percent of Electricidad de Caracas (EDC) from AES Corporation as part of a renationalization program. Subsequently, the ownership share rose to 93.62% (December 2008). EDC has 11% of Venezuelan capacity, and owns the majority of conventional thermal power plants. The rest of the power production is owned by private companies.

The national transmission system (Sistema Interconectado Nacional, SIN) is composed by four interconnected regional transmission systems operated by EDELCA, CADAFE, EDC and ENELVEN-ENELCO. Oficina de Operación del Sistema Interconectado (OPSIS), jointly owned by the four vertical integrated electric companies, operate the SIN under an RTPA regime.

See also

Energy crisis in Venezuela
2019 Venezuelan blackouts

References

 
Venezuela